Samuel Comstock (February 6, 1680 – October 26, 1752) was a member of the Connecticut House of Representatives from Norwalk in the sessions of October 1711, October 1714, May 1720, October 1723, October 1725, October 1726, October 1727, October 1728, October 1729, and October 1730.

He was the son of Christopher Comstock and Hannah Platt.

References 

1680 births
1752 deaths
Burials in East Norwalk Historical Cemetery
Members of the Connecticut House of Representatives
Politicians from Norwalk, Connecticut
People of colonial Connecticut